V718 Persei is a young star in the constellation of Perseus, located in the young open cluster IC 348. The star has several designations derived from the cluster in which it belongs (H 187, TJ 108, HMW 15, LRL 35, NTC 5401, LNB 90—all require the prefix "IC 348"). The star shows hints of an occulting body of unclear nature, likely planetary.

A planetary system?

In 2008 Grinin et al. invoke the possible presence of a substellar object to explain peculiar and periodic eclipses occurring to the young star every 4.7 years. The presence of a planetary object is still invoked in a recent research. They infer a maximum mass of 6 times that of Jupiter for the perturbing object and an orbital separation of 3.3 astronomical units.

References

Perseus (constellation)
Persei, V718
K-type main-sequence stars
T Tauri stars
Hypothetical planetary systems